Carla's Christmas Carols is an album of  Christmas carols arranged by American composer, bandleader and keyboardist Carla Bley with bassist Steve Swallow and the Partyka Brass Quintet recorded in France in 2008 and released on the Watt/ECM label in 2009.

Reception
The Allmusic review by Thom Jurek awarded the album 4 stars and stated "While the argument that there should be a moratorium on Christmas recordings is a good one in the 21st century, Carla's Christmas Carols provides a powerful counter to that view. She has added so much to these songs without taking away any of the warmth, joy, and nostalgia inherent to the season or their place in it".

The All About Jazz review by John Kelman said that "Most Christmas albums are only good for a limited time each year. The songs Bley has chosen may have such iconic significance as to be tied to a specific time of year, but the arrangements and playing are so good that Carla's Christmas Carols transcends the season for which it's intended; an album that will also bring more than a little welcome cool to the heat of the summer."

Track listing
 "O Tannenbaum" (Traditional) - 2:30
 "Away in a Manger" (James R. Murray) - 5:54
 "The Christmas Song" (Mel Torme, Bob Wells) - 5:15
 "Ring Christmas Bells" (Mykola Leontovych) - 5:49
 "God Rest Ye Merry Gentlemen Part 1" (Traditional) - 4:47
 "God Rest Ye Merry Gentlemen Part 2" (Traditional) - 5:19
 "It Came Upon a Midnight Clear" (Richard Storrs Willis, Edmund Sears) - 4:57
 "Hell's Bells" (Carla Bley) - 5:13
 "Jesus Maria" (Bley) - 8:33
 "Jingle Bells" (James Pierpont) - 3:06
 "O Holy Night" (Adolphe Adam, Placide Cappeau) - 7:29
 "Joy to the World" (Lowell Mason, Isaac Watts) - 1:38

 Recorded at La Buissonne Studios, Avignon, France on December 4–9, 2008.

Personnel
Carla Bley - piano, celeste
Steve Swallow - bass guitar, chimes
Tobias Weidinger - trumpet, flugelhorn, glockenspiel
Axel Schlosser - trumpet, flugelhorn, chimes
Christine Chapman - horn
Adrian Mears - trombone
Ed Partyka - bass trombone, tuba

References

ECM Records albums
Carla Bley albums
Christmas albums by American artists
2009 albums